Santo Antônio do Itambé is a municipality in the state of Minas Gerais, Brazil. The population is 3,799 (2020 est.) in an area of 305.74 km².

The municipality contains part of the  Pico do Itambé State Park, created in 1998.

References

External links
 http://www.citybrazil.com.br/sp/stoantonioitambe/ (in Portuguese)

Municipalities in Minas Gerais